Ju language may refer to:

 Ju languages (!Kung)
 Ju language (Chadic)